Sisikon railway station is a railway station in the Swiss canton of Uri and municipality of Sisikon. The station is situated on the Gotthard railway between Arth-Goldau and Erstfeld.

Services 
 the following services stop at Sisikon:

References

External links
 
 

Railway stations in the canton of Uri
Swiss Federal Railways stations